Sergei Abramov (born February 1, 1993) is a Russian professional ice hockey player. He is currently playing with Molot-Prikamie Perm of the Supreme Hockey League (VHL).

Abramov made his Kontinental Hockey League (KHL) debut playing with Amur Khabarovsk during the 2013–14 KHL season.

References

External links

1993 births
Living people
Amur Khabarovsk players
Russian ice hockey centres
Sportspeople from Perm, Russia